Françoise Schepmans (born 18 June 1960, Sint-Agatha-Berchem) is a Belgian politician for the Mouvement Réformateur, a French-speaking liberal party in Belgium. She has been a member of the Parliament of the Brussels-Capital Region and the Parliament of the French Community since 2019.

She was also Mayor of Molenbeek from 2013–2018, and was shortlisted for World Mayor in 2018.

Honours
 Officer of the Order of Leopold (2009)

References

Living people
1960 births
People from Sint-Agatha-Berchem
People from Molenbeek-Saint-Jean
Université libre de Bruxelles alumni
20th-century Belgian women politicians
20th-century Belgian politicians
21st-century Belgian women politicians
21st-century Belgian politicians
Women mayors of places in Belgium
Order of Leopold (Belgium)
Members of the Parliament of the French Community
Members of the Parliament of the Brussels-Capital Region